Bakhmut, formerly known as Artemivsk or Artyomovsk, is a city in eastern Ukraine. It serves as the administrative center of Bakhmut Raion in Donetsk Oblast. Bakhmut was designated a city of regional significance until 2020 when the designation was abolished. Population: 

Bakhmut was the capital of Slavo-Serbia (1753–1764), which was established by mainly Serbian frontiersmen. In 1920–1924, the city was an administrative center of Donets Governorate of the Ukrainian SSR.

During the 2022 Russian invasion of Ukraine, Bakhmut was besieged by Russian forces and largely destroyed, with most of its population having fled. , Ukrainian forces remain in partial control of the city, which is an epicentre of fierce fighting, as Russian forces battle to take control.

Etymology
The origin of the name Bakhmut is not known for sure. According to a theory by Kharkiv historian Igor Rassokhaa, the word may derive from a Turkic/Tatar word meaning 'salt water' or 'beach".

The former name of Artyomovsk/Artemivsk is named after Fyodor Sergeyev, better known as Comrade Artyom.

Name change

 1571–1924: Bakhmut
 1924–1941: Artyomovsk/Artemivsk
 1942–1943: Bakhmut
 1943–1992: Artyomovsk/Artemivsk
 1992–2016: Artemivsk
 2016–present day: Bakhmut

History

Early history 

Although there is evidence of prior settlement in 1556, the first official mention of Bakhmut dates from 1571, when Ivan the Terrible, in order to protect the southern border of the Russian state from Crimean–Nogai slave raids, ordered the creation of border fortifications along the Aidar and Siverskyi Donets rivers. The settlement was described then as a guard-fort (storozha) named after the nearby Bakhmutka River, a tributary of the Siverskyi Donets, and located at the mouth of a stream called the Chornyi Zherebets.

The history of Bakhmut before the 18th century is sparse. It was initially a border post that later became a fortified town. In 1701, Peter I ordered the fort at Bakhmut to be upgraded and the adjacent sloboda (free village) of Bakhmut be designated a city. The new fort was completed in 1703 and housed 170 people. In 1704, Peter commanded some Cossacks to settle at the Bakhmutka River and mine salt. The population of Bakhmut doubled, and the town was assigned to the Izium Regiment, a province of Sloboda Ukraine.

In the autumn of 1705, Bakhmut became one of the centers of the Bulavin Rebellion. A detachment of Don Cossacks headed by Ataman Kondraty Bulavin captured the Bakhmut salt mines and occupied the city until 7 March 1708, when it was retaken by government troops.

From 1708 to 22 April 1725, Bakhmut was assigned to the Azov Governorate. On 29 May 1719, it became the administrative center of Bakhmut Province within the Azov Governorate. From 1753 to 1764, it was a major city of Slavo-Serbia, a territory inhabited by colonists from Serbia and elsewhere.

In 1783, Bakhmut became a city within the Yekaterinoslav province (Novorossiysk Governorate). At this time the city contained 49 great houses and five factories that produced bricks, candles, and soap. The city had about 150 shops, a hospital, and three schools: two private boarding schools for children of wealthy parents, and a Sunday school for children of workers. Bakhmut had a large city center where fairs were held twice a year, on 12 July (Day of the Apostles Peter and Paul) and 21 September (Day of the Nativity of the Blessed Virgin Mary). The city's annual turnover was about 1 million rubles.

On 2 August 1811, the city emblem was approved. On 25 January 1851, the city became a municipality, with Vasily I. Pershin as mayor. In 1875, a municipal water system was installed.  In 1876, large deposits of rock salt were discovered in the Bakhmut Basin, leading to a rapid increase in the number of salt mines. Bakhmut soon produced 12% of the total Russian output of salt.

20th century 

Streets were paved in Bakhmut in 1900. The construction of the Kharkov-Bakhmut-Popasnaya railroad encouraged production of alabaster, plaster, brick, tile, and soda ash in Bakhmut. At the beginning of the twentieth century, the city developed a metal-working industry. By 1900, the city had 76 small industrial enterprises, which employed 1,078 workers, as well as four salt mines, which employed 874 workers.

By 1913, the population consisted of 28,000 people. There were two hospitals with 210 beds, four secondary and two vocational schools, six single-class schools, four parish schools, and a private library. In April 1918, after the collapse of the Russian Empire, troops loyal to the Ukrainian People's Republic took control of Bakhmut. On 27 December 1919, Soviet control over the city was established. In 1923, there were 36 enterprises in Bakhmut, including a "Victory of Labor" factory that formerly made nails and spikes, a "Lightning" factory that produced castings for agriculture, as well as brick, tile, and alabaster factories, and one shoe factory. Local mines were renamed "Karl Liebknecht and Sverdlov", "Shevchenko", and "Bakhmut salt". From 16 April 1920 to 1 August 1925, Bakhmut was the administrative center of the Donetsk province.

In 1924, the city's name was changed from Bakhmut to Artemivsk, in honour of a Russian Bolshevik (Communist) revolutionary figure known as  Comrade Artyom who lived and worked in the city in the early years of the revolution. In 1938, a man named Moskalenko was the First Secretary of the Municipal Committee of the Communist Party of Ukraine in Artemivsk. In 1941, Vasily Panteleevich Prokopenko was First Secretary of the City Committee of the Communist Party.

During the Second World War, German troops occupied Artemivsk from 31 October 1941 to 5 September 1943. Nikolai Mikhailovich Zhorov was the secretary of the underground City Party Committee during occupation from 1941. In early 1942, German Einsatzgruppe C took some 3,000 Jews from Artemivsk to a mine shaft two kilometres outside of town and shot into the crowd, killing several people and driving the rest into a tunnel. The soldiers then bricked up the entrance to the tunnel, suffocating the thousands of people trapped inside.

In 1961, Kuzma Petrovich Golovko became First Secretary of the City Party Committee, followed by Ivan Malyukin in 1966, Nikolai S. Tagan in 1976, and Yuri K. Smirnov from 1980 to 1983. From April 1990 to 1994, during the dissolution of the Soviet Union, Alexei Reva was Chairman of the Artemivsk City Council and was elected mayor in 1994, three years after Ukraine regained its independence.

In January 1999, a charitable Jewish foundation in Bakhmut, the Artemivsk city council, and a winery that had opened on the site in 1952, inaugurated a memorial to commemorate the victims of the 1942 mass murder. The memorial was built into a rock face in the old mine where water collects and was named the "Wailing Wall" for the murdered Jews of Bakhmut.

Russo-Ukrainian War

2014 war in Donbas 

During the 2014 pro-Russian unrest in Ukraine, the rebels of the Donetsk People's Republic claimed the city of Artemivsk as part of their territory. Ukrainian government forces recaptured the city, along with Druzhkivka, on 7 July 2014.

On 15 May 2015, Ukrainian president Petro Poroshenko signed a bill into law that started a six-month period for the removal of communist monuments and the mandatory renaming of settlements with names related to communism. On 23 September 2015, the city council voted to restore the city's former name of Bakhmut. The final decision was made by the Verkhovna Rada on 4 February 2016.

2022 Russian invasion 

During the 2022 Russian invasion of Ukraine, Bakhmut became a frontline city in May, and was regularly shelled by Russian forces. In May 2022, according to local authorities, an estimated 20,000 people remained in the city. Russia prioritised Bakhmut as its main offensive effort through August 2022.

According to the Associated Press in October 2022, "taking Bakhmut would rupture Ukraine's supply lines and open a route for Russian forces to press on toward Kramatorsk and Sloviansk, key Ukrainian strongholds in Donetsk province". In a December analysis of the offensive, however, the UK Ministry of Defence said "the capture of the town would have limited operational value although it would potentially allow Russia to threaten the larger urban areas of Kramatorsk and Sloviansk".

On 11 December 2022, Ukrainian president Volodymyr Zelenskyy said that Russian forces had turned the city into "burned ruins".

By early March 2023, Russian forces had not yet taken Bakhmut, but were continuing to press the attack, and hoped to complete their encirclement of the city. On 4 March, the deputy mayor of the city said that 4,000 civilians remained in Bakhmut and were living in shelters with no access to water, gas or electricity.

Climate

Demographics

, the population of Bakhmut was 75,900.

According to the Ukrainian Census of 2001, the majority of residents are ethnic Ukrainians who speak Russian as a first language:

Economy

Since 1951, the European Bakhmut Winery is located in the city. The Artemsil salt mine is located in the suburb of Soledar, which contains the world's largest underground room. It is large enough that a hot air balloon has been floated inside, symphonies have been played before, and two professional football matches have been held at the same time.

Transport

The highways of Kharkiv-Rostov and Donetsk-Kyiv run through Bakhmut. The city has a public transport system consisting of a network of trolleybuses and buses.

Education

There are 20 schools (11,600 students), 29 kindergartens (3500 children), 4 vocational schools (2,000 students), 2 technical schools (6,000 students), and several music schools. Some include:

 Artemivsk Industrial College (Tchaikovsky Street)
 Donetsk Musical College named after Ivan Karabyts (Lermontov Street)
 Donetsk Pedagogical School (St. Annunciation)
 Donetsk Medical School (St. W. Nosakova)
 Artemivsk professional school (St. Defence)

After the 2014 outbreak of the war in Donbas the Horlivka Institute for Foreign Languages was evacuated and is now operating in Bakhmut.

Culture
 Artemovsk City Center Children and Youth (Artema Street)
 Artemovsk city center of culture and recreation (Svoboda)
 Artemovsk City Folk House (Victory Street)
 Building Technology "Donetskgeologiya" (St. Sibirtzev)
 Palace of Culture "mechanician" (Artema Street)

See also
 Bulavin Rebellion

Notes

References

External links

  Artemivsk at the Encyclopedia of Ukraine
  City portal
  Encyclopedia of History of Ukraine
  City council website

 
1571 establishments in Europe
Populated places established in 1571
Cities in Donetsk Oblast
Bakhmut Raion
Mining cities and regions in Ukraine
City name changes in Ukraine
Former Soviet toponymy in Ukraine
Cities and towns built in the Sloboda Ukraine
Bakhmutsky Uyezd
Destroyed cities
Razed cities